The 2016–17 UEFA Champions League group stage began on 13 September and ended on 7 December 2016. A total of 32 teams competed in the group stage to decide the 16 places in the knockout phase of the 2016–17 UEFA Champions League.

Draw
The draw was held on 25 August 2016, 18:00 CEST, at the Grimaldi Forum in Monaco. The 32 teams were drawn into eight groups of four, with the restriction that teams from the same association could not be drawn against each other. For the draw, the teams were seeded into four pots based on the following principles:
Pot 1 contained the title holders and the champions of the top seven associations based on their 2015 UEFA country coefficients.
Pots 2, 3 and 4 contained the remaining teams, seeded based on their 2016 UEFA club coefficients.

Moreover, the draw was controlled for teams from the same association in order to split the teams evenly into the two sets of groups (A–D, E–H) for maximum television coverage.

The fixtures were decided after the draw. On each matchday, four groups play their matches on Tuesday, while the other four groups play their matches on Wednesday, with the two sets of groups (A–D, E–H) alternating between each matchday. There are other restrictions: for example, teams from the same city (e.g., Real Madrid and Atlético Madrid) in general do not play at home on the same matchday (UEFA tries to avoid teams from the same city playing at home on the same day or on consecutive days, due to logistics and crowd control), and teams in certain countries (e.g., Belarus, Russia, Kazakhstan) do not play at home on the last matchday (due to cold weather and simultaneous kick-off times).

On 17 July 2014, the UEFA emergency panel ruled that Ukrainian and Russian clubs would not be drawn against each other "until further notice" due to the political unrest between the countries. Therefore, Ukrainian club Dynamo Kyiv (Pot 3) and Russian clubs CSKA Moscow (Pot 1) and Rostov (Pot 4) could not be drawn into the same group.

Teams
Below are the participating teams (with their 2016 UEFA club coefficients), grouped by their seeding pot. They include 22 teams which enter in this stage, and the 10 winners of the play-off round (5 in Champions Route, 5 in League Route).

Notes

Format
In each group, teams play against each other home-and-away in a round-robin format. The group winners and runners-up advance to the round of 16, while the third-placed teams enter the Europa League round of 32.

Tiebreakers
The teams were ranked according to points (3 points for a win, 1 point for a draw, 0 points for a loss). If two or more teams were equal on points on completion of the group matches, the following criteria were applied in the order given to determine the rankings (regulations Article 17.01):
higher number of points obtained in the group matches played among the teams in question;
superior goal difference from the group matches played among the teams in question;
higher number of goals scored in the group matches played among the teams in question;
higher number of goals scored away from home in the group matches played among the teams in question;
if, after having applied criteria 1 to 4, teams still had an equal ranking, criteria 1 to 4 were reapplied exclusively to the matches between the teams in question to determine their final rankings. If this procedure did not lead to a decision, criteria 6 to 12 applied;
superior goal difference in all group matches;
higher number of goals scored in all group matches;
higher number of away goals scored in all group matches;
higher number of wins in all group matches;
higher number of away wins in all group matches;
lower disciplinary points total based only on yellow and red cards received in all group matches (red card = 3 points, yellow card = 1 point, expulsion for two yellow cards in one match = 3 points);
higher club coefficient.

Groups
The matchdays were 13–14 September, 27–28 September, 18–19 October, 1–2 November, 22–23 November, and 6–7 December 2016. The match kickoff times are 20:45 CEST/CET, except for matchday 5 in Russia which are 18:00 CET. The match kickoff times for matchdays 4 and 5 in Turkey were changed from 20:45 CET to 18:45 CET due to the decision of the Turkish government to use the UTC+3 time zone all year round starting from September 2016.

Times are CET/CEST, as listed by UEFA (local times are in parentheses).

Group A

Group B

Group C

Group D

Group E

Group F

Group G

Group H

Notes

References

External links
2016–17 UEFA Champions League

Group Stage
2016-17